Murphy's I.O.U. is a 1913 American short comedy film featuring Fatty Arbuckle.

Cast
 Phyllis Allen
 Roscoe 'Fatty' Arbuckle
 Nick Cogley
 Dot Farley
 Henry Lehrman
 Fred Mace as Murphy
 Hank Mann
 Charles Murray
 Mack Sennett as Policeman
 Ford Sterling
 Al St. John

See also
 List of American films of 1913
 Fatty Arbuckle filmography

External links

1913 films
1913 comedy films
American silent short films
American black-and-white films
Films directed by Mack Sennett
1913 short films
Silent American comedy films
American comedy short films
1910s American films